Andrés Gómez and Alberto Mancini were the defending champions, but did not participate this year.

Pablo Albano and David Engel won the title, defeating Neil Borwick and David Lewis 6–3, 7–6 in the final.

Seeds

  Jan Gunnarsson /  Udo Riglewski (first round)
  Horacio de la Peña /  David Macpherson (first round)
  Jakob Hlasek /  Marc Rosset (first round)
  Vojtěch Flégl /  Marián Vajda (first round)

Draw

Draw

References
Draw

1990 Geneva Open
1990 in Swiss sport
1990 ATP Tour